Moncucco Torinese is a comune (municipality) in the Province of Asti in the Italian region Piedmont, located about  east of Turin and about  northwest of Asti.

It has a castle (14th century), housing a Museum of Chalk.

Moncucco Torinese borders the following municipalities: Albugnano, Arignano, Berzano di San Pietro, Castelnuovo Don Bosco, Cinzano, Marentino, Mombello di Torino, Moriondo Torinese, and Sciolze.

References

Cities and towns in Piedmont
Castles in Italy